Felipe Etcheverry Cavanna also known as Felipe Echeverry (born 23 June 1996) is a Uruguayan rugby union player who generally plays as a fullback represents Uruguay internationally. He was included in the Uruguayan squad for the 2019 Rugby World Cup which was held in Japan for the first time and also marked his first World Cup appearance.

Career 
Etcheverry made his international debut for Uruguay against Russia on 4 June 2019. In 2022, He competed for Uruguay at the Rugby World Cup Sevens in Cape Town.

References 

1996 births
Living people
Uruguayan rugby union players
Uruguay international rugby union players
Rugby union fullbacks
Rugby union players from Montevideo
Peñarol Rugby players
Rugby union fly-halves